Kelvinside Academicals is a former rugby union team that played their home games at Balgray Playing Fields, Glasgow, Scotland.

The team was founded in 1888 by former pupils of the Kelvinside Academy. The team no longer exists.

In 1982 it merged with Glasgow HSFP - the rugby team of another school; the High School of Glasgow - to form a rugby club called Glasgow High Kelvinside.

In 1997, the 1st XV of Glasgow High Kelvinside merged with the 1st XV of Glasgow Academicals to form Glasgow Hawks. Both GHK and Academicals survived the merger as individual clubs and now compete in SRU National League 2 - 2 divisions below Hawks.

In 2018 Glasgow Hawks relocated to Balgray from Old Anniesland to play their games there in the Tennent's Premiership as part of a new partnership with Kelvinside Academy. Hawks now train at Craigholme School's Sports Complex in Pollok Park.

History

Founded in 1888, Kelvinside Academy Former Pupils formed a rugby club.

Throughout the 1890s they were noted for a fast open style of play.

The club played at various locations in the Anniesland area until the early years of the Twentieth Century.

For a short period after the Second World War, Kelvinside Academicals joined with West of Scotland to form a new club Kelvinside-West.

Sevens tournament

Kelvinside Academicals first hosted a rugby sevens tournament in 1922. It was re-started in 1974 playing for the Minerva Cup. The Kelvinside Academicals Sevens ended when the club merged with Glasgow HSFP.

Past winners

Notable former players

Scotland internationalists

The following former Kelvinside Accies players have represented Scotland at full international level.

Glasgow District

The following former Kelvinside Accies players have represented Glasgow District at provincial level.

Honours

 Bearsden Sevens
 Champions: 1976, 1982
 Cambuslang Sevens
 Champions: 1978
 Kilmarnock Sevens
 Champions: 1933
 Stirling Sevens
 Champions: 1965
 Cartha Sevens
 Champions: 1972, 1973

References

Rugby clubs established in 1888
Rugby union in Glasgow
Scottish rugby union teams
Defunct Scottish rugby union clubs
Rugby union clubs disestablished in 1982
1888 establishments in Scotland
1982 disestablishments in Scotland